A distributed workforce is a workforce that conducts remote work. A distributed workforce is dispersed geographically over a wide area – domestically or internationally. Via technology, distributed companies enable employees located anywhere to access all of the company's resources and software such as applications, data and e-mail without working within the confines of an office.

Description
A company with a distributed workforce connects its employees using a networking infrastructure that makes it easy for team members across the world to work together. Using a shared software approach called SaaS, or software as a service, workers and teams can share files securely as well as access the company's databases, file sharing, telecommunications/unified communications, customer relationship management (CRM), video teleconferencing, human resources, IT service management, accounting, IT security, web analytics, web content management, e-mail, calendars and much more.

History of distributed work
New technologies are changing important aspects of how we live and work, and the ways we manage distance in the work environment.The management of distance requires more than just technical artifacts. In fact, techniques, social conventions and norms, organizational structures, and institutions are also required. In this section, we take a look at the ways "distributed work" has evolved over the past several centuries, but we specifically cover the last 50 years.

Over the 20th century the workplace became increasingly associated with the office building. In the mid 1900s, the most prominent business strategy was based on a mechanistic view of office workers as units of production to be housed in a unified and controlling space. Then, in the 1960s the office was seen as a communications system, with the floor plan opening up to facilitate the free flow of information. This office space was designed with the intention of fostering communication and flexible teamwork within the physical location. Then in the 1980s there was a major workplace revolution as the computer moved from the computer room to the desktop. In the 1990s a second workplace revolution saw the introduction of “new ways of working” a response to the realization that information technology was transforming cultural, social, technological and construction processes. At this time, the virtual world and digital tools reduced the need for synchronous, face-to-face communication and colocation for office workers for the purposes of carrying out defined tasks. This digital revolution was the convergence between communications and computing technologies which now allows individuals and organizations to connect in ways, and on scales that were previously inconceivable. Today, the new economy is characterized by increasing virtualization of products, processes, organizations and relationships. The new economy production no longer requires people to work together in the same physical space to access the tools and resources they need to produce their work and allows for distributed work.

After reviewing the chapter "Trust and Control in the Hudson's Bay Company" in the book "Distributed Work", distributed work has been studied throughout history and not simply since the middle of the 1900s. Between 1670 and 1826, management had to rely on trust and control to successfully manage distributed work. During this time, in addition to dispersed operations that relied heavily on a combination of explicit information and detailed record-keeping, more tacit and situated knowledge developed through socialization and participating in life on the Bay.

The Hudson's Bay Company case of distributed work showed a variety of control mechanisms including selection techniques, information requirements, and direct local oversight through its distributed practices of socialization, communication, and participation. For example, the elaboration of reporting requirements during the period of inland expansion were used to supplement the current knowledge. A final aspect to note from the HBC case is the senior managements early learning about the strengths and weaknesses of contracts as a means of controlling distant agents. Early on the managers found out that "common sense" was not enough to encourage everyone to comply. Instead, the company's managers created a way to encourage all workers to comply to the businesses norms. All in all the HBC, concludes that trust and control is vital in distributed groups and organizations. HBC suggests that the process and outcome of geographically dispersed work is shaped by the interaction of a number of elements that are more complex, dynamic, and emergent than suggested by the contemporary literature. Thus, it is important to review distributed work prior to its public emergence in the 21st century.

Key concepts
There are several key terms associated with collocated work and distributed work. The most important concepts are common ground, coupling in work, collaboration readiness, and technology readiness. This section will briefly define these four concepts.

Common ground refers to the knowledge that participants have in common, and they are aware that they have this information in common. Common ground is not just established from some general knowledge about the person's background, but also through specific knowledge learned from several different cues that are available at the moment, including the person's appearance and behavior during conversational interactions. The figure below, shows the characteristics that contribute to achieving common ground that are inherent in various communication media.

It is important to note that those who are remote complain about the difficulty of establishing common ground. This is because when individuals are connected by audio conferencing, it is difficult to tell who is speaking if you do not know the participant well. However, people with video can engage in the subtle negotiation that establishes local common ground- whether what was said was understood or not, whether the conversation can proceed or needs repair. Overall, the more common ground people can establish, the easier the communication will be and the greater the productivity.

Coupling refers to the extent and kind of communication required by the work. Tightly coupled work is work that strongly depends on the talents of collections of workers and is non-routine, and even ambiguous. Components of this type of work are highly interdependent, meaning that the work requires frequent, complex communication among group members, with short feedback loops and multiple streams of information. This type of communication is very difficult in remote locations, mostly because technology does not support rapid back and forth conversations or awareness and repair of ambiguity. On the other hand, loosely coupled work has fewer dependencies or is more routine. It is important that all group members establish common ground about the task, goals, and procedures before working, but this type of work overall requires less frequent or less complicated interactions.

Collaboration readiness is a groups willingness to work together and share their ideas. Using shared technology assumes that the coworkers need to share information and are rewarded for sharing it. It is important to note that one should not attempt to introduce groupware and remote technologies in organizations and communities that do not have a culture of sharing and collaboration.

Common ground is often used in collaboration, where a team is out to solve a complex problem. In order to solve a complex problem, the different skills and perspectives of members in a team must be pooled together. To do so, the team must make sure that they are on common ground in terms of knowledge and representation of the problem. Care must be taken to note that to achieve common ground when collaborating, differences are constructively managed, rather than downplayed. This is because collaboration differs from compromise.

Technology readiness is a company or groups willingness and ability to use technology. Companies require a technical infrastructure if they are going to adopt technologies in the company. In particular, they require the habits, including those of preparation, regular access, attention given to others’ need for information, in order to effectively use the necessary technology for distributed work. Researchers repeatedly see that failure of distributed work often results from attempts to introduce new technologies to organizations or communities that are not yet comfortable with technologies that are already in place. The following chart explains the order in which various collaboration technologies should be adopted in organizations to allow the employees to become familiar with and learn each new technology.

The list below shows the observed order in which various collaboration technologies were adopted and used in different organizations.
 Telephone
 Fax
 E-mail
 Audio conferencing
 Voicemail
 E-mail with attachments
 Video conferencing
 Repositories built by others (e.g., intranet sites of static information)
 Shared calendaring
 Creating repositories
 Hand-off collaboration (e.g., using the Tracking Changes option in MS Word)
 Simultaneous collaboration (e.g., NetMeeting, Exceed, or Timbuktu screen sharing)

As this chart shows, advanced technologies should be introduced in small steps.

These key concepts are important because they help differentiate between collocated and distributed work. Later on a fifth concept of organizational management was proposed.Organizational management is the "practices by which management activities are part of shaping the fundamental premises for collaboration without proximity"

Distributed versus collocated teams
There are two types of work that explain the geographical distance between coworkers/collaborators. Collocated work is the case in which team members are at the same location. Distributed work is the term used to explain team members who are not in the same physical location when working on a project. There are many differences, similarities, benefits, and obstacles of these two types of work. In order to distinguish between collocated and distributed work, it is necessary to go into more detail.

Collocated work is the case in which the team members are at the same physical location. This may be temporary due to travel to a common location or permanent because all collaborators of the group are at the common work site. Same location means that the coworkers can get to each other's workspaces with a short walk and communicate via face-to-face interactions. Also, during meetings or small group meetings, a major advantage of collocated work is that individuals are able to move from one meeting to another, simply by overhearing a conversation, seeing what someone is working on, and being aware of how long they had worked on it with or without progress. In addition, during these meetings coworkers can observe someone's reaction by being able to see his/her gesture or glance. This allows for one to make sure that the group has common ground prior to moving on. Also, coworkers have access to common spaces for group interactions and have mutual access to significant shared information. In a study, researchers observed an individual describe something by drawing with his hands in the air. Later, someone referred to “that idea” by pointing to the spot in the air where the first person had “drawn his idea”.

Opposite of collocated work, distributed work is the case in which team members are not physically in the same location. Thus, they are forced to use different methods of technology to communicate to make progress on the project/problem they are working on. Today, the technology distributed work groups use to communicate is constantly changing because of rapid changes and because different groups have varying access to technology.  describe the options of communication today which include:
 Telephony in its current incarnation
 Meeting room video conferencing
 Desktop video and audio conferencing
 Chat rooms for text interactions
 File transfer
 Application sharing
 Some very primitive virtual reality options

Distributed work can be very successful, if the company or group displays technology readiness. Some of the benefits of distributed work include:
 Simultaneous access to real-time data from instruments around the world, allowing coworkers to talk while something is happening
 Cost reduction – both for the employee and the employer. While the company experience sales costs on supplies, office space rental, etc, the remote worker has the same benefit on reducing their own cost on things like meals, fuel and car maintenance.
 Microsoft NetMeeting has been a success. People who had previously driven long distances to attend a meeting in their area began attending from their offices. These individuals chose to forego the time and stress of travel in favor of remote participation
 Ongoing work – 1,000 software engineers working on the project in four sites. Has allowed numerous people at various different sites to stay in contact over email video and audio conferencing, transferred files and fax. If everyone understands the structure of the collaborative work and knows his or her role, distributed work can be a success.

Distributed work is far from perfect and there are many failures, some of which include:
 Complaints about the quality of communication over audio and video conferencing
 Hard to detect a person's motivation when you are not in the office. For example, if someone had a tough meeting you do not know this and therefore will not know that it is not the right time to send a lengthy, stern email. One important feature of collocation that is missing in remote work is awareness of the state of one's coworkers, both their presence-absence and their mental state.

Overall, people who have little common ground benefit significantly from having a video channel.

Communication technology
Effective group communication involves various nonverbal communication characteristics. Because distance limits interpersonal interaction between members of distributed groups, these characteristics often become constrained. Communication media focuses on alternative ways to achieve these qualities and promote effective communication. This section addresses communication technology in relation to the theories of grounding and mutual knowledge, and discusses the costs and benefits of various communication technology tools.

Grounding and technology

Grounding in communication is the process of updating the evolving common ground, or shared information, between participants. The base of mutual knowledge is important for effective coordination and communication. Additionally, participants constantly gather various forms of verbal and nonverbal evidence to establish understanding of change and task.

The following are means of grounding and collecting evidence:

Different forms of communication result in the varied presence of these communication characteristics. Therefore, the nature of communication technology can either promote or inhibit grounding between participants. The absence of grounding information results in reduced ability to read and understand social cues. This increases the social distance between them.

Costs to grounding change

The lack of one of these characteristics generally forces participants to use alternative grounding techniques, because the costs associated with grounding change. There is often a trade-off between the costs: one cost will increase as another decreases. There is also often a correlation between the costs. The following table highlights several of the costs that can change as the medium of communication changes.

Examples of communication technology
 	
 Structured Management (Hinds & Kiesler)
It has been argued that work can be adapted to individual situations through task decomposition and version control. This can be applied to distributed groups by allowing groups to divide the work into manageable chunks. Group members can work autonomously and come together to produce a finished product. Many recent software developments have been built to specifically address this method.

 Email
Email prevents the communication of verbal inferences, such as sarcasm and humor and, additionally, leaves email writers unaware of what their communication is lacking. When people try to anticipate the perspective of their email audience, studies suggest that they end up pulling upon their own experience and perspective instead. This often leads to inconsistencies in email conversation and chaotic communication.

Case study: Boeing-Rocketdyne SLICE

Background
A team made up of a variety of professionals from different companies collaborated from different geographic locations to create an optimized rocket engine. They encountered a variety of challenges and used communication technology tools to plan and execute the project.

Task

SLICE was tasked with designing a rocket engine at th the current cost, increase the speed to market by ten times, and increase the rocket engine useful life by three times. Additionally, this team of eight presented their design after 10 months of work, without committing more than 15% of their working time to the project, without collocated meetings and without a common professional ground.

Management practice 1: Strategy-setting

The managers at the three involved companies began the project by spending a year developing an umbrella agreement, the “Continuous Ordering Agreement”, which explicitly defined contractual obligations, the allocation of intellectual property, and the allotment of time the team would have to work on the project. Determining these policies of risk management, project responsibility and funding between companies required a significant level of trust and respect between the teams.

The Continuous Ordering Agreement strategically accomplished three fundamental elements of a successful inter-company team. The team was able to candidly share information without worrying about disclosing company intellectual property, the planning time between idea and project kick-off was significantly reduced, and the team was protected from management changes within their respective companies.

Management practice 2: Technology use

The team primarily used the Internet Notebook, the Project Vault and teleconferences as their methods of collaborative technology. The Internet Notebook allowed the team to securely and remotely access the project and work on and review other ideas simultaneously. The Project Vault was a common file storage and information transfer tool used to promote sharing of all information. Although the team initially planned to use only this written communication, but, due to the overwhelming number of ideas and amount of data, the team began to hold two teleconferences a week. The following table illustrates the capabilities of each method:

In order to maintain efficiency and minimize confusion, the team decided to address their need for knowledge management by retracting the prohibition of face-to-face conversations and instead enforcing a rule of total information sharing. The issue then became the organization and order of ideas, which was not as simply solved. Another issue was the involvement and interaction of team members with their collocated teams. Because the team members were also involved with other projects at their respective companies, they also altered their protocol to allow for interruptions and multitasking during meetings. This unintentionally resulted in the team performing just-in-time analysis and receiving real-time feedback.

Management practice 3: Work restructuring

The team found that the necessary changes to work structure, in order to accommodate virtual collaboration, should be limited as to prevent complications in the fulfillment of basic creative needs. The team specifically identified these needs as consistent and frequent communication between all team members, rapid creation and deletion of information, and a common ground of the task and solutions. SLICE consequently restructured their work to both meet these requirements and enhance the virtual collaboration experience for all members.

Results

After ten months of working on this project, with no more than 15% of each member's time dedicated to it and each member working from a different geographic location, the team designed an optimized rocket engine with fewer parts (6 parts instead of the normal ~1,200), a 14-fold decrease in manufacturing cost (from $7 million to $0.5 million), and the highest-ever quality performance in the industry.

Distance work in the future
In the future, design improvements and more horsepower will solve a number of current problems that currently cause limitations of distance technologies. Greater bandwidth will solve the disruptive influence of today's delays in audio and video transmission. This will also allow for larger, smoother, more life-size displays of remote workers, making their interaction more similar to the flow of face-to-face interactions. In the future, it is possible that technology will provide capabilities that are in some ways superior to face-to-face options. However, it is likely that problems will result from distributed work technologies and from a lack of knowledge to operate the technologies in the future and face-to-face interactions will not be able to be eliminated completely.

See also
 Distributed company

References

 Olson, G. M. & Olson, J. S. (2000). Distance matters. Human-Computer Interaction, 15(2-3), 139-178.
 Olson, J. S., Hofer, E., Bos, N., Zimmerman, A., Olson, G. M., Cooney, D., & Faniel, I. (2008). A theory of remote scientific collaboration. In G. M. Olson, A. Zimmerman & N. Bos (Eds.), Scientific Collaboration on the Internet. . Cambridge, MA:: MIT Press.
 Malhotra, Arvind, Majchrzak, Ann, Carman, Robert & Lott, Vern (2001). Radical innovation without collocation: A case study at Boeing-Rocketdyne. MIS Quarterly, 25(2).
 Maznevski, M., & Chudoba, C. (2000). Bridging space over time: Global virtual team dynamics and effectiveness. Organization Science, 11(5), 473-492.
 Clark, Herbert H. & Brennan, Susan E. (1991). Grounding in communication. In L. B. Resnick, R. M. Levine, & S. D. Teasley (Eds.). Perspectives on socially shared cognition. (pp. 127–149). Washington, DC: American Psychological Association.
 Krauss, R. M. & Fussell, S. R. (1990). Mutual knowledge and communicative effectiveness. In J. Galegher & R. E. Kraut, et al. (Eds.), Intellectual teamwork: Social and technological foundations of cooperative work (pp. 111–145). Hillsdale, NJ, England: Lawrence Erlbaum Associates
 Kiesler, S., & Cummings, J. (2002). What do we know about proximity and distance in work groups? A legacy of research. In P. Hinds, & Kiesler, S. (Ed.), Distributed Work (pp. 57–82). Cambridge, MA: MIT Press.
 Gergle, D., Kraut, R. E., & Fussell, S. R. (2013). Using Visual information for grounding and awareness in collaborative tasks. Human Computer Interaction, 28(1), 1-39.
 Kruger, J., Epley, N., Parker, J., & Ng, Z.-W. (2005). Egocentrism over e-mail: Can we communicate as well as we think? Journal of Personality and Social Psychology, 89(6), 925-936.
 Book: Harrison, Andrew, Paul Wheeler, and Carolyn Whitehead. The distributed workplace sustainable work environments. London: Spon Press, 2004. Print.
 Hinds, P. J., & Bailey, D. E. (2003). Out of sight, out of sync: Understanding conflict in distributed teams. Organization Science, 14(6), 615-632.
 Zhu, H., Kraut, R. E., & Kittur, A. (2012). Effectiveness of shared leadership in online communities CSCW'12: Proceedings of the ACM Conference on Computer-Supported Cooperative Work (pp. 407–416 ). NY: ACM Press.
 Hinds, Pamela, and Sara Kiesler.Distributed work. Cambridge, Mass.: MIT Press, 2002. Print.

Workforce